Zwicky is a surname. Notable people with the surname include:

Arnold Zwicky, linguist
Fay Zwicky (1933–2017), Australian poet and academic
Fritz Zwicky, astrophysicist who proposed dark matter, or objects named after him:
Zwicky (crater), crater on the moon
1803 Zwicky, asteroid
Jan Zwicky, Canadian poet
Rolf Zwicky (born 1957), Swiss sailor
Tommy Zwicky, Danish journalist and television presenter